Carl E. Flodström (12 August 1863 – 17 November 1930) was a Swedish sport shooter who competed in the 1912 Summer Olympics. In 1912, he finished eighth in the 300 metre military rifle, three positions competition.

References

External links
profile

1863 births
1930 deaths
Swedish male sport shooters
ISSF rifle shooters
Olympic shooters of Sweden
Shooters at the 1912 Summer Olympics
People from Falun Municipality
Sportspeople from Dalarna County